Stanwick or Stanwyck may refer to:

Places
in England
Stanwick, Northamptonshire
Stanwick, North Yorkshire
Stanwick Iron Age Fortifications, otherwise known as "Stanwick Camp", North Yorkshire
Stanwick Hall (disambiguation)

People
 Barbara Stanwyck (1907–1990), Hollywood and television actress
 Leslie Stanwyck, with the pop band Universal Honey
 Steele Stanwick (born 1989), collegiate and Major League Lacrosse player

Other
 Battle of Stanwick, a Roman victory in 71 AD in northern England

See also
 Stanwix
 Swanwick (disambiguation)